Amazon.com, Inc., is an American electronic commerce and cloud computing company headquartered in Seattle, Washington. Founded by Jeff Bezos on July 5, 1994, as an online bookstore, Amazon went public after an initial public offering on May 15, 1997, during the midst of the dot-com bubble. The funds gained from the IPO allowed Amazon to grow quickly, making its first three acquisitions on April 27, 1998, less than a year after the company had gone public.

After the dot-com bubble burst on March 11, 2000, several companies that Amazon had invested in went bankrupt, with Amazon's stock price itself sinking to record lows. Despite Amazon's survival, the company made very few investments for the next several years, only acquiring two companies between 2000 and 2004. The company returned to making multiple acquisitions per year in 2005, focusing on acquiring digital retailers and media websites. Starting in 2011, Amazon began shifting its focus to buying technology startups to develop and improve Amazon Echo and grow its Amazon Web Services division.

Amazon has diversified its acquisition portfolio into several market sectors, with its largest acquisition being the purchase of the grocery store chain Whole Foods Market for $13.7 billion on June 16, 2017.

Acquisitions

Stakes

Divestitures

See also 
 List of largest mergers and acquisitions
 Lists of corporate acquisitions and mergers

References 

Amazon (company)
 
Amazon